Verdigris Township is a township in Wilson County, Kansas, in the United States.

History
Verdigris Township was named from the Verdigris River, where pioneer settlers built their first cabins.

References

Townships in Wilson County, Kansas
Townships in Kansas